GBT may refer to:

Transport 
 Gambat railway station, in Pakistan
 Gorgan Airport, in Iran
 Gotthard Base Tunnel, in Switzerland 
 Greater Bridgeport Transit Authority, in Connecticut

Other uses 
 Gelora Bung Tomo Stadium, in Surabaya, Indonesia
 Generalised beam theory
 Global Bio-Chem, a Hong Kong biotechnology company
 Government and binding theory, in linguistics
 Great Baikal Trail, a Russian environmental organisation
 Green Bank Telescope, in West Virginia
 G-TELP Business Test, English language test
 Gwinnett Ballet Theatre, in Lawrenceville, Georgia, United States